Samuel Stevenson (21 September 1884 – 14 August 1948) was a British long-distance runner. He competed in the men's 5 miles at the 1908 Summer Olympics.

References

External links
 

1884 births
1948 deaths
Athletes (track and field) at the 1908 Summer Olympics
British male long-distance runners
Olympic athletes of Great Britain
Place of birth missing